Cold-hardy citrus is citrus with increased frost tolerance and which may be cultivated far beyond traditional citrus growing regions. Citrus species and citrus hybrids typically described as cold-hardy generally display an ability to withstand wintertime temperatures below . Cold-hardy citrus may be generally accepted 'true' species (e.g. Satsuma mandarin, kumquat) or hybrids (e.g. citrange) involving various other citrus species.  All citrus fruits are technically edible, though some have bitter flavors often regarded as unpleasant, and this variability is also seen in cold-hardy citrus fruits. Those listed as "inedible fresh" or "semi-edible" can (like all citrus) be cooked to make marmalade.

Varieties 

Varieties of true citrus considered cold-hardy, ordered from most to least hardy:

Interspecific hybrids 
Interspecific hybrid varieties considered cold-hardy, ordered from most to least hardy:

See also
 Citrus rootstock

References

External links 
The Citrus Industry Volume 1 & 2

Citrus
Citrus hybrids
Lists of plants
Gardening aids